Radnička Kontrola (trans. Workers' Control) was a former Yugoslav punk rock/new wave band from Belgrade, active in the late 1970s and early 1980s and notable for its appearance on the compilation album Artistička radna akcija.

After the band ceased to exist, vocalist Zoran Kostić "Cane" rose to nationwide and popularity as a frontman of the eminent former Yugoslav and Serbian rock band Partibrejkers from Belgrade. Another member of the group Srđan Todorović "Žika" later became a drummer for the cult bands Ekatarina Velika and Disciplina Kičme. He achieved international success as a movie actor.

History

Formation and breakup 
The band was formed in 1979, featuring Zoran Kostić "Cane" (vocals), who previously worked with Kopilad and Urbana Gerila, Srdan Marković "Đile" (bass), Darko Milojković (guitar) and Srđan Todorović "Žika" (drums). The band member was shortly the drummer Mladen Pajević who later played with Radost Evrope, Šine, Robna Kuća and Lutke.

The band recorded only two tracks, "Dosada" ("Boredom") and "TV u koloru" ("Colour TV"), both of which appeared on the various artist compilation Artistička radna akcija. The recordings featured guest appearances by Petar i Zli Vuci members guitarist Ljuba Sedlar who played drums, and drummer Relja Obrenović.

Radnička Kontrola appeared at a two-day new wave festival held in Belgrade's Tašmajdan Park during September 1981. The performance became infamous due to young Kostić who continually provoked the audience until so much commotion was created that the police decided to step in and stop the show. Kostić's behavior prompted a discussion in the newspapers on the morals and values of Yugoslav youth. The band's last live appearance took place one month later during October 1981 in Ljubljana as support act for Šarlo Akrobata. This was also Šarlo Akrobata last concert.

Post breakup 
After the band disbanded, Kostić formed his own band Partibrejkers, becoming one of the most popular Yugoslav bands. He also participated the Rimtutituki anti war project in 1992, Pesme iznad istoka i zapada Christian rock project, and Kao da je bilo nekad... Posvećeno Milanu Mladenoviću, Milan Mladenović tribute album.

Srđan Todorović Žika joined Bezobrazno Zeleno with whom he recorded their first studio album. Then he moved on to Disciplina Kičme (1984–1987), Ekatarina Velika (1987–1990) and Kazna Za Uši on their 1994 album Izliv radosti napad srece. Beside music he also worked as an actor and later completely devoted to acting. He is one of the most successful Serbian actors.

Srđan Marković "Đile" started working as a writer and a visual artist mainly inspired by 1960s underground comic books. He also worked with Disciplina Kičme and in 1989 formed an electro post-punk duo DDT, renamed to Supernaut in 1993.

Darko Milojković worked with Disciplina Kičme, appearing on the 1985 EP Ja imam šarene oči and 1986 studio album Svi za mnom!, and Boye, appearing on their 1988 album Dosta! Dosta! Dosta!.

Discography

References 

 EX YU ROCK enciklopedija 1960-2006, Janjatović Petar;

External links 
 Radnička Kontrola at Last.fm
 Radnička Kontrola at Youtube
 Radnicka Kontrola at Discogs

Serbian punk rock groups
Serbian new wave musical groups
Yugoslav punk rock groups
Musical groups from Belgrade
Musical groups established in 1979
Musical groups disestablished in 1981